Dimitar Yanakiev Vlahov (8 November 1878 – 7 April 1953) was a politician from the region of Macedonia and member of the left wing of the Macedonian-Adrianople revolutionary movement (also known as Internal Macedonian Revolutionary Organization (IMRO)). As with many other IMRO members of the time, historians from the North Macedonia consider him an ethnic Macedonian and in Bulgaria he is considered a Bulgarian. Vlahov declared himself until the early 1930s as a Bulgarian and afterwards as an ethnic Macedonian. However according to some historians such left-wing Macedonian activists, former members of the Bulgarian Communist Party and the IMRO (United) never managed to get rid of their strong Bulgarophile sentiments, and thus practically continued to feel themselves as Bulgarians even in Communist Yugoslavia.

Life
He was born in Kılkış (Bulgarian/Macedonian Kukush, in present-day Greece) and attended the Bulgarian Men's High School of Thessaloniki. After that he emigrated to the Principality of Bulgaria and graduated from secondary school in Belogradtchik. Vlachov also studied chemistry in Germany and Switzerland, where he also took part in socialist circles.  However, he graduated in these subjects from Sofia University. Here he enrolled in the Bulgarian Social Democratic Workers' Party. In 1903, Vlahov entered a military service in the reserve officer's school in Sofia. Then he worked as a teacher in the Bulgarian Men's High School of Thessaloniki where he was active in IMRO. During this period, he was arrested by the Ottoman authorities. In 1905, Vlahov was released and went back to Bulgaria where he worked as a teacher in Kazanlak. In 1908, after the Young Turks revolution he began working in the Bulgarian secondary school in Thessaloniki again.

In the following years, Vlahov was politically active as a deputy in the Ottoman Parliament as a representative of the People's Federative Party (Bulgarian Section). After the dissolution of this party in 1911, he became a member of the Ottoman Socialist Party and in 1912 he was again elected as a deputy to the Ottoman Parliament. During the Balkan Wars, on the recommendation of Simeon Radev, he was appointed head of the consular department of the Ministry of Foreign Affairs in Sofia. He was then sent as Bulgarian consul to Smyrna in the Ottoman Empire. During the First World War, as a reserve officer, he was appointed governor of the Shtip and Prishtina districts, then under Bulgarian rule. Later he represented the Kingdom of Bulgaria in high diplomatic and administrative positions in Odessa, Kiev and Vienna. When IMRO was re-established in 1920, Vlahov was elected as an alternate member of its Central Committee, representing the left wing. At that time he was secretary of the Varna Chamber of Commerce. Todor Alexandrov urged him to establish contact between IMRO and Soviet Russia. Krastyo Rakovski, his best man and a prominent figure in the Comintern, served as his messenger. On behalf of IMRO, Vlahov left in July 1923 for Moscow. Thus, in 1924, IMRO started negotiations in Vienna with the Comintern on collaboration between the communists and the Macedonian movement in establishing a united Macedonian movement. Vlahov assisted in the adoption of the so called May Manifesto on the formation of a Balkan Communist Federation and cooperation with the Soviet Union. After the subsequent rift between the organization and the communists, the new leadership led by Ivan Mihailov excluded him from the organization and he was sentenced to death. In 1925, he was one of the founders of IMRO (United) in Vienna. He also became a member of the Bulgarian Communist Party. At the end of the 1920s he worked in France, Germany and Austria as a Comintern publicist. During this period he was pursued by IMRO and several failed assassination attempts were organized against him.

In 1932 members of IMRO (United), put for the first time the issue of the recognition of a separate Macedonian nation in a lecture in Moscow. The question was also studied in the highest institutions of the Comintern and in the autumn of 1933, Dimitar Vlahov arrived in Moscow and took part in a number of meetings. So on 11 January 1934, the Political Secretariat of the Comintern adopted a special Resolution on the Macedonian Question. From 1936 to 1944, Vlahov lived in the Soviet Union and in late 1944 he went to the new Yugoslavia with Socialist Republic of Macedonia, where he worked in high state and political positions. In November 1944 he returned to the newly liberated Skopje and became a member of the Communist Party of Macedonia.

 On 26 November, at the First Conference of the National Liberation Front of Macedonia, he was elected its president, and at the Second Session of Anti-fascist Assembly for the National Liberation of Macedonia (ASNOM) in December he was elected a member of the Presidium of ASNOM. At the Third Session of ASNOM in April 1945 he became a member of the Presidium of the National Assembly of Macedonia.

In 1948 on a meeting of the Central committee of the Macedonian Communist Party he claimed that the decision by the IMRO (United) from 1932 on the formation of a separate Macedonian ethnicity and language was a political mistake. Later his name was scraped  from Macedonian anthem. Afterwards he was gradually pushed out of his power positions from the pro-Yugoslav circle around Lazar Kolishevski. Vlahov was dismissed, because he came from the Bulgarian Communist Party, communicated much better in Bulgarian than in the newly codified Macedonian language, and had little political support in then SR Macedonia. He died in Belgrade in 1953.

Footnotes

External links 

 Biography of Dimitar Vlahov, Skopje, 1966, Gustav Vlahov (Macedonian)
 Dimitar Vlahov, Struggle of the Macedonian people for liberation, Vienna 1925 (Bulgarian)
  "Такрир подаден от българските депутати: Далчев, Дорев, Павлов, Влахов и арм. Вахан Папасиян до Отоманския парламент", публикувано във в. "Вести", брой 129(юли), Цариград, 1909 година A declaration of the Bulgarian senators in the Ottoman parliament - 1909 (in Bulgarian)
  Димитър Влахов от Кукуш, Егейска Македония - "Спомени от Солун", публикувано в сп. "Илюстрация Светлина", книга I, год. XIII, София, 1905 година in Bulgarian
  "Мемоар на българските депутати против поведението на Младотурския режим към българското население", публикувано във в. "Дебърски глас" брой 10, София, 1910 година Memoire of the Bulgarian deputies in the Ottoman parliament against the treatment of the Bulgarian population by the Young Turk regime. (In Bulgarian)

1878 births
1953 deaths
People from Kilkis
People from Salonica vilayet
Members of the Internal Macedonian Revolutionary Organization
Internal Macedonian Revolutionary Organization (United) members
Bulgarian Workers' Social Democratic Party politicians
Bulgarian expatriates in the Soviet Union
Bulgarian diplomats
Bulgarian educators
Bulgarian emigrants to Yugoslavia
League of Communists of Macedonia politicians
Bulgarian Comintern people
Bulgarian communists